Abacetus australasiae is a species of ground beetle in the subfamily Pterostichinae. It was described by Maximilien Chaudoir in 1878 and is an endemic species found in Australia.

References

australasiae
Beetles described in 1878
Beetles of Australia